Joe the King is a 1999 drama film, written and directed by Frank Whaley, based largely on his own childhood and the childhood of his brother. It stars Noah Fleiss, Val Kilmer, Karen Young, Ethan Hawke, John Leguizamo, Austin Pendleton, Camryn Manheim, Max Ligosh, and James Costa. The film premiered at the 1999 Sundance Film Festival, where it won the Waldo Salt Screenwriting Award (shared with Guinevere).

Plot

The story takes place in Upstate New York during the 1970s. 14-year-old Joe Henry has spent his life in an abusive household. His father, Bob, is a raging, violent alcoholic, while his mother, Theresa, feels too stressed to pay attention to him and lives in fear of getting caught in the path of her husband's wrath. His brother, Mike, about a year older, is normal and friendly, but offers no affirmative guidance. He mostly ignores Joe as he does not want the association of Joe's natural uncoolness (as well as the rest of his family) ruining his attempts to get into the "in" crowd. Joe is taunted by his classmates, and hassled by people his father owes money to. To make matters worse, one night Bob goes off the deep end and smashes all of Theresa's records. When Joe comes home from work to discover this, Henry tells him Bob was triggered by finding condoms in Theresa's purse, implying she secretly works as a prostitute to bring in whatever additional income she can for the family, which would also explain her absence from the house the majority of the day.

In response to economic pressure, Joe takes a full-time job after school working at a local diner, leaving him tired and even less able to keep up with class work. Because he is underage, Joe works there illegally, resulting in the owners exploiting him for cheap, underpaid labor and treating him rather poorly. His co-worker, Jorge, is the only person there who treats him with any kindness and frequently sticks up for him. Failing in school, Joe is assigned a guidance counselor named Leonard Coles, who, though reasonably friendly, is incompetent. For example, in their first session, when Joe starts to talk about his problems, the counselor unthinkingly shuts him off.

Throughout the movie, Joe is seen engaging in petty theft (shoplifting from stores, breaking into cars to lift items inside, and stealing from mailboxes) to raise money to pay off Bob's debts and replace Theresa's records. Also, due to his family's poverty and, as a result, likely having to go hungry most days, he is often seen stealing food from the diner to feed himself and his brother. This reaches its climax when, one night, nearing the end of his shift, Joe learns from Jorge, who decides to leave early, that two of his bosses (a couple: Jerry and Mary) living in the apartment directly above the diner have already left and are gone for the weekend. This presents Joe an opportunity to rob the diner and acquire the money he needs.

After his shift, he sneaks in through an upstairs window and ransacks the apartment, looking for a locked metal box that was previously revealed to contain a large quantity of cash. Joe finds the box, but then catches a glimpse of himself in a doorway mirror. Horrified at what he has become, he kicks the mirror in and badly cuts his leg. Though injured, he manages to escape before another one of his bosses, an older man named Roy, who is drunkenly making his way back to the apartment to retrieve his house keys, is able to catch him.

The next day, as Joe arrives to the diner to start his shift, Jorge is outside having a smoke. He stares at Joe suspiciously, then proceeds to angrily inform Joe that he knows he was the one who broke into the place and stole the money. Sticking up for Joe as usual, however, he states he will not tell anyone that Joe was responsible. Jorge then tells him to not worry about getting caught, as Jerry and Mary believe Mary's ex-husband was responsible and Roy having been so inebriated that night, thought Joe was a giant rat running past him and knocked him down the stairs. Jorge then tells Joe to leave and never return to avoid suspicion.

Using the stolen money, Joe buys brand new copies of Theresa's records that were destroyed by Bob and stores them in a space beneath his house with an enveloped note for his mother. Joe's plan ultimately goes south when he reveals his deed to his friend Ray, who, in turn, reveals to Coles that Joe works at the diner, prompting a concerned Coles to place a call to the diner and speaks to Jerry. Coles threatens to report Jerry and the others to the authorities for illegally employing Joe, should they not cease doing so immediately. Jerry complies, but then after Coles unwittingly reveals to him that Joe injured himself while working there by cutting his leg, Jerry correctly deduces that it was Joe who committed the robbery and calls the police.

Joe is subsequently arrested and is sentenced to a juvenile detention center for six months. Later on, as Bob drives Joe to the bus that will take Joe away, Bob uncharacteristically offers Joe his condolences and some words of advice about not making poor decisions in life and ending up a loser like Bob himself did. Joe then exits Bob's car and boards the bus. The film ends with Joe walking down the hallway of the detention center with a look of grave uncertainty on his face.

Production
Whaley used French New Wave films as main models, especially The 400 Blows.

Leguizamo, who was also the executive producer, filmed his scenes for three days between Staten Island and the Broadway theater where his one-man show Freak was being staged.

Cast 
 Noah Fleiss as Joe Henry
 Max Ligosh as Mike Henry, Joe's older brother
 Val Kilmer as Bob Henry, Joe's father
 Karen Young as Theresa Henry, Joe's mother
 James Costa as Ray
 John Leguizamo as Jorge
 Ethan Hawke as Leonard Coles
 Richard Bright as Roy
 Robert Whaley as Jerry
 Amy Wright as Mary
 Camryn Manheim as Mrs. Basil

References

External links

 
The entire film officially posted by Frank Whaley on Vimeo
Trailer

1999 films
1999 drama films
Sundance Film Festival award winners
Films directed by Frank Whaley
1999 independent films
Films about domestic violence
Films about dysfunctional families
Films set in New York City
Trimark Pictures films
1999 directorial debut films
Films about child abuse
Films set in the 1970s
1990s English-language films
American crime drama films
1990s American films